Fame and Misfortune is a 1986 Australian TV series for children about a young boy trying to raise money for a piano.

Kylie Minogue makes a cameo appearance in this programme.

References

External links

Australian children's television series
1986 Australian television series debuts